Leesville is a village in the town of East Haddam, Middlesex County, Connecticut, United States, on Connecticut Route 151, north of the town center. It was originally named Lord's Mills after a local vegetable oil watermill, the first in Connecticut.

References

East Haddam, Connecticut
Villages in Middlesex County, Connecticut
Villages in Connecticut